Dreamtime is a single from singer/songwriter Daryl Hall (part of pop-rock duo Hall & Oates). Co-written by John Beeby, it was issued prior to the release of his second solo album, Three Hearts in the Happy Ending Machine.

It was his biggest hit as a solo performer, climbing the Billboard Hot 100 to peak at number 5 in October 1986 and reached #3 on the Radio & Records CHR/Pop Airplay chart on September 9, 1986 for one week and remained on the chart for twelve weeks. The hit helped drive its parent album up the charts to peak at number 29.

Formatting
The original recording is 4:45 in length. The music video extends the track length to 5:12.  Aside from some ad-libs near the video version's fade-out, there is little difference between the album version and the video.

Personnel
 Daryl Hall: lead and backing vocals, electric guitar, keyboards
 David A. Stewart: guitar solo
 Tom "T-Bone" Wolk: bass guitar, electric guitar
 Tony Beard: drums
 Michel de la Porte: percussion
 Kate St. John and June Montana: additional backing vocals
 Michael Kamen: string arrangements and conductor

Reception
In his four-star review of the parent album, allmusic writer Stephen Thomas Erlewine singled out the song, calling it "tremendous" and "a swirling slice of arty new wave psychedelia that stands in direct contrast to anything Hall & Oates sent into the Top Ten".

Charts

Weekly charts

Year-end charts

References

1985 songs
1986 singles
Daryl Hall songs
Songs written by Daryl Hall
RCA Records singles